Anedie Azael (b. Port-au-Prince, 1988) is a Haitian model, activist, and best known as a beauty pageant contestant.

Personal life
Anedie was raised in Port-au-Prince, Haiti, by her parents, Eddy and Chantale Azael. In 2004, at the age of 16, she moved to Miami, Florida to pursue her studies in business management where she graduated in 2006. In 2009 she signed with Runways The Talent Group in Miami, which helped her accumulate some experience as a professional model along the way, working for some major fashion houses such as Macy's, Dior and Carolina Herrera.

Humanitarian efforts
In August 2010, Azael founded the humanitarian organization called the, Peace Love International, whose purpose is to help the women and children of Haiti.

Pageantry
She is the official representative of Haiti for Miss Universe 2011, which was held in São Paulo, Brazil on September 12, 2011.

References

External links
Azael: Miss Haiti Universe on Her Life, Love and Haiti

See also
 Evelyn Miot - Miss Haiti Universe 1962

1988 births
Living people
People from Port-au-Prince
Miss Universe 2011 contestants
Haitian beauty pageant winners
Haitian female models
Haitian expatriates in the United States
Miss International 2012 delegates